Bunker is a surname.

People
Notable people with the surname include:
 Berkeley L. Bunker (1906–99), American politician
 Chang and Eng Bunker (1811–74), Thai-American conjoined twin brothers
Christopher Bunker (born 1956), British dermatologist
 Clive Bunker (born 1946), drummer
 Dennis Miller Bunker (1861–90), American painter
 Earle Bunker (1912–75), American photographer, one of the two winners of the 1944 Pulitzer Prize
 Eber Bunker (1761–1836), American sea captain and pastoralist
 Edward Bunker (Mormon) (1822–1901), American Mormon pioneer 
 Edward Bunker (1933–2005), American writer
 Ellsworth Bunker (1894–1984), American diplomat
 Howard G. Bunker (1905–94), USAF General
 Larry Bunker (1928–2005), American jazz drummer, vibraphonist, and percussionist
 Mark Bunker, American broadcast journalist, videographer and documentary filmmaker
 Max Bunker (born 1939), Italian comic book artist
 Michael Bunker (born 1937), Anglican clergyman
 Nathaniel M. Bunker (1817–89), American politician
 Paul Bunker (1881–1943), American football player and soldier
 Philip Bunker, British-Canadian scientist
 Rob Bunker (born 1988), American race car driver
 Robert J. Bunker, American academic
 Wally Bunker (born 1945), former Major League Baseball pitcher

Fictional characters
 Bunker (DC Comics), character in Teen Titans, a super-hero
 Archie Bunker, Carroll O'Connor's character on All in the Family
 Edith Bunker, Jean Stapleton's character on All in the Family
 Gloria Stivic (née Bunker), from All in the Family